Adam Leroy Lane (born August 6, 1964) is a convicted murderer who was dubbed the Highway Killer because his crimes took place near the highway, which he frequently traveled due to his job as a trucker.

Murders 
Lane was born on August 6, 1964, in Jonesville, North Carolina. He dropped out of high school and later acquired a job as a  truck driver and occasional chicken-plant worker. He lived in a trailer with his wife and three daughters.

Lane committed the murders while he made his way through the Northeastern United States during the summer of 2007. He had a DVD in his truck of the 2002 horror film Hunting Humans, about a serial killer who stalks his victims before killing them with a knife. He also carried two large hunting knives, choke wire, and a leather mask with the eyes and mouth cut out.

His first known victim was 42-year-old Darlene Ewalt, who lived in a suburban home in West Hanover Township, Dauphin County, near Harrisburg, Pennsylvania. She was stabbed and killed at around 2 AM on 13 July 2007. At the time, she was talking on the telephone on her patio. Lane slit her throat and stabbed her to death with a long knife while her family was inside the house.

Lane's second victim was a woman named Patricia Brooks, whom he stabbed on 17 July 2007 in Conewago Township, in rural York County, Pennsylvania, as she was sleeping on her couch. She survived.

His third victim was a 38-year-old woman in her duplex in Bloomsbury, New Jersey by the name of Monica Massaro. He cut her throat and stabbed her in the head, neck, and chest, and killed her in her bedroom a day before he committed his final crime.

His final crime transpired when he made a stop on I-495 in Chelmsford, Massachusetts, broke into a house on 30 July 2007, and while clad in all-black with a mask and gloves attacked 15-year-old Shea McDonough with a 15-inch hunting knife.  Her parents, Jeannie and Kevin McDonough, awoke at 4 AM  to the sounds of her struggling. Her 135-pound mother and 160-pound father were able to subdue the 245-pound Lane and wrestle the knife he was carrying away from him, though the mother suffered knife cuts.  Chelmsford Police were contacted, arrived at the scene where the father was holding him in a headlock, and arrested him.

While it has been speculated by law enforcement authorities that he has been involved with other murders in other parts of the country due to his extensive trucking routes, this has not been proven. He has refused to comment to police or the general public about this speculation.

Investigation
Lane was linked to Ewalt by DNA on his knife. He was linked to Brooks similarly. Police also discovered gloves with his DNA and one of his victim's blood.

Trials and imprisonment
Lane received a 25–30 year sentence in Massachusetts for the attack on the teenage girl.

New Jersey sentenced him to 50 years for the murder of Monica Massaro.

In Pennsylvania, Lane pleaded guilty in order to avoid the death penalty. He was sentenced to 10–20 years for the attempted murder of the woman in York County, and to life for the murder of Darlene Ewalt. He is serving his sentences in State Correctional Institution – Fayette.

In the media
The story has been presented in the Dateline NBC series (original air date 3 August 2009) and 48 Hours Mystery episode, "Live to Tell: Hunting Humans" (original air date 26 February 2011),. The case also featured in episode 2, season 1, of Nightmare Next Door and the episode 5, season 7, of Castle.

In 2013 Shea McDonough told her story in a documentary titled I Survived A Serial Killer.

Also, it was featured in Reader's Digest July 2011 in an article entitled "Caught in the Act." Also in Season 1 of The Coroner: I Speak for the Dead, episode 2 titled "Call the Coroner" (original air date 25 July 2016).

References

Further reading

21st-century American criminals
Living people
American people convicted of murder
American people convicted of attempted murder
People convicted of murder by New Jersey
People convicted of murder by Pennsylvania
American prisoners sentenced to life imprisonment
Prisoners sentenced to life imprisonment by Pennsylvania
1964 births
People from Jonesville, North Carolina
American truck drivers
American spree killers